The International Mozarteum Foundation (Internationale Stiftung Mozarteum) was founded in 1880 in Salzburg with its primary concern being the life and work of Wolfgang Amadeus Mozart. Closely affiliated with the Mozarteum University Salzburg, it was preceded by the Cathedral Music Association and Mozarteum of 1841. It collects Mozart memorabilia, maintains the Mozart library (the Bibliotheca Mozartiana), the Mozart birthplace and other Salzburg locations linked with Mozart. The Foundation also promotes research regarding Mozart and administers various awards such as the Mozart Medal, the Preis der Internationalen Stiftung Mozarteum, the Lilli Lehmann Medal, and presents up to twenty other performances year-round.

Mozartwoche

The Mozartwoche ("Mozart Week") is an annual festival devoted to performances of the composer's works. It was created in 1956 on the occasion of the 200th anniversary of his birth, and coincides with his birthday around 27 January. The festival attracts visitors from all over the world and typically includes opera performances, orchestral, chamber and recital concerts featuring world-class orchestras and artistes.

References

External links
Official Mozarteum Foundation site

Musical groups established in 1880
Culture in Salzburg
Wolfgang Amadeus Mozart
Organisations based in Salzburg
Duchy of Salzburg